The Association for Intercollegiate Athletics for Women was founded in 1971 to govern collegiate women’s athletics and to administer national championships.  During its existence, the AIAW and its predecessor, the Division for Girls' and Women's Sports (DGWS), recognized via these championships the teams and individuals who excelled at the highest level of women's collegiate competition.

After the 1981–82 academic year, the AIAW discontinued sponsorship of national championships and later was legally dissolved.  At this time, the NCAA assumed sole sanctioning authority of its member schools' women's sports programs.

Governing bodies of women's collegiate athletics through 1982

The Division of Girls and Women's Sports (DGWS), a division of the American Alliance for Health, Physical Education and Recreation (AAHPER), was the first nationally recognized collegiate organization for women’s athletics and the forerunner of the AIAW. The Commission on Intercollegiate Athletics for Women (CIAW) operated under the auspices of the DGWS.  The CIAW governed from 1966 until February, 1972, and conducted championships in eight sports.

During the 1972–73 season, the first full academic year of its operation, the AIAW offered its first eight national championships in the same eight sports (badminton, basketball, golf, gymnastics, softball, swimming & diving, track & field, and volleyball).

In years when small-college championships (Division II or III) were not contested, and in sports without divisions, there was open competition among eligible teams.

Except as noted below, the NCAA sponsored its first women's championship in each sport in the 1981–82 academic year.  Individual athletic programs and, in some cases, individual teams within a program were permitted to choose to participate in either the AIAW or NCAA competitions (or both in a few instances).  The NCAA has never sponsored championship competition in badminton, synchronized swimming, or slow-pitch softball.

In the sports of fencing, lacrosse, rowing and tennis, for completeness, the champions listed below include those bestowed by each sport's governing body prior to the beginning of AIAW championships in those sports.

Compilations of collegiate records by the NCAA, continuing into 2006, have ignored or segregated the contributions of AIAW athletes.  Major college basketball's career women's scoring leader, Lynette Woodard of the University of Kansas, speaking on the exclusion of AIAW statistics, said, "Basketball doesn't just start with when the NCAA blessed it.  And it's not about Jackie [Stiles, NCAA career scoring leader] and it's not about Lynette. It's about history. History is history."

Sports with AIAW/DGWS team championships by year

Badminton 

AIAW championship 1973–82. Previously administered by the Division of Girls' and Women's Sports (DGWS).

1970 Long Beach State (DGWS)
1971 Arizona State (DGWS)
1972 Pasadena City College (DGWS)
1973 Pasadena City College
1974 Long Beach State
1975 Arizona State
1976 Arizona State
1977 UCLA
1978 Arizona State
1979 Arizona State
1980 Arizona State
1981 Arizona State
1982 Northern Illinois

After the last AIAW competition, collegiate badminton assumed the authority of its own national tournament committee in conjunction with the United States Badminton Association. The USBA continued the sponsorship of national collegiate championships from 1983. Wisconsin won in 1983. Arizona State won all ten titles from 1984 through 1993, when ASU dropped badminton.

Basketball 

Pre-NCAA statistics, based on AIAW Archives, Special Collections, University of Maryland Libraries.

Division I (no division 1968–1974, Large College 1974–1979) 

AIAW championship 1972–82. Previously administered by the Commission on Intercollegiate Athletics for Women (CIAW).

1969 West Chester (Pennsylvania) def. Western Carolina 65-39 (CIAW invitational tournament, six player format)
1970 Cal State-Fullerton def. West Chester 50-46 (CIAW invitational tournament, six player format)
1971 Mississippi State College for Women def. West Chester 57-55 (CIAW qualification tournament)
1972 Immaculata (Pennsylvania) def. West Chester 52-48
1973 Immaculata def. Queens (New York) 59-52
1974 Immaculata def. Mississippi College 68-53
1975 Delta State (Mississippi) def. Immaculata 90-81
1976 Delta State def. Immaculata 69-64
1977 Delta State def. LSU 68-55
1978 UCLA def. Maryland 90-74
1979 Old Dominion def. Louisiana Tech 75-65
1980 Old Dominion def. Tennessee 68-53
1981 Louisiana Tech def. Tennessee 79-59
1982 Rutgers def. Texas 83-77

Division II (Small College 1974–1979) 

1975 Phillips University (Oklahoma)
1976 Berry College (Georgia)
1977 Southeastern Louisiana
1978 High Point (North Carolina)
1979 South Carolina State
1980 University of Dayton
1981 William Penn College (Iowa)
1982 Francis Marion College (South Carolina)

Division III 

1980 Worcester State College (Massachusetts)
1981 Wisconsin–La Crosse
1982 Concordia College (Minnesota)

Junior/Community College 

1973 Mississippi Gulf Coast Junior College
1974 Anderson College (South Carolina)
1975 Anderson College
1976 Anderson College
1977 Anderson College

Cross Country

Division I (no division 1975–1979) 

1975 Iowa State
1976 Iowa State
1977 Iowa State
1978 Iowa State
1979 North Carolina State
1980 North Carolina State
1981 Iowa State

Division II 

1979 Air Force (Colorado)
1980 South Dakota State
1981 Utah

Division III 

1979 Cal State-Hayward
1980 Cal State-Hayward
1981 College of St. Thomas (Minnesota)

Fencing 

AIAW championship 1980–82. Previously administered by the National Intercollegiate Women's Fencing Association.  The IWFA became the National IWFA in 1964 and called for a National Championship.

1964   Paterson State (New Jersey)
1965   Paterson State
1966   Paterson State
1967   Cornell
1968   Cornell
1969   Cornell
1970   Hunter College (New York)
1971   NYU
1972	Cornell
1973	Cornell
1974	Cal State Fullerton
1975	San Jose State
1976	San Jose State
1977	San Jose State
1978	San Jose State
1979	San Jose State

AIAW, 1980–1982:
1980	Penn State
1981	Penn State
1982	Yale

The NIWFA has continued to sponsor national collegiate championships from 1983 through the present.  From 1990 through the present the NCAA has sponsored a combined men's and women's team championship.

Field Hockey

Division I (no division 1975–1979)

Co-sponsored 1975–78 by the United States Field Hockey Association (USFHA).

1975 West Chester (Pennsylvania) def. Ursinus (Pennsylvania) 2-1 (penalty strokes)
1976 West Chester def. Ursinus 2-0
1977 West Chester def. Ursinus 1-0
1978 West Chester def. Delaware 3-2
1979 Long Beach State def. Penn State 2-0
1980 Penn State def. California 2-1
1981 Penn State def. Temple (Pennsylvania) 5-1

Division II 

1979 Southwest Missouri State def. Colgate (New York) 2-0
1980 La Salle (Pennsylvania) def. Southwest Missouri State 3-2
1981 Lock Haven (Pennsylvania) def. Syracuse 2-0

Division III 

1979 Shippensburg (Pennsylvania) def. Franklin & Marshall (Pennsylvania) 1-0
1980 Gettysburg (Pennsylvania) def. Hartwick (New York) 1-0 (ps)
1981 Bloomsburg (Pennsylvania) def. Lynchburg (Virginia) 3-2

Golf

Division I (no division 1970–1980)

Team 

1970 Miami (Florida) (DGWS)
1971 UCLA (DGWS)
1972 Miami
1973 UNC Greensboro (two player teams)
1974 Rollins (Florida)
1975 Arizona State
1976 Furman
1977 Miami
1978 Miami
1979 SMU
1980 Tulsa
1981 Florida State
1982 Tulsa

Individual 
Gladys Palmer from Ohio State University initiated the women's intercollegiate golf championship in 1941. After World War II, the DGWS (known as the National Section on Women's Sports until 1957) crowned an individual collegiate golf national champion from 1946 through 1971, when it became an AIAW event.

Division II

Team 

1981 William and Mary (Virginia)
1982 Weber State (Utah)

Individual 

1981 Susan Fox, Colorado State
1982 Heidi Wallin, Weber State

Division III

Team 

1981 Sacramento State
1982 UNC Wilmington

Individual 

1981 Kris Elton, Concordia College (New York)
1982 Luann Johnson, Meredith College (North Carolina)

Gymnastics

Division I (no division 1968–1977, Large College 1977–1979) 

1969 Springfield College (Massachusetts) (DGWS)
1970 Southern Illinois (DGWS)
1971 Springfield College (DGWS)
1972 Springfield College (DGWS)
1973 Massachusetts
1974 Southern Illinois
1975 Southern Illinois
1976 Clarion State (Pennsylvania)
1977 Clarion State
1978 Penn State
1979 Cal State Fullerton
1980 Penn State
1981 Utah
1982 Florida

Division II (Small College 1977–1979) 

1978 Centenary (Louisiana)
1979 Centenary
1980 Centenary
1981 Centenary
1982 Denver

Division III 

1980 Wisconsin–Oshkosh
1981 UC Davis
1982 Gustavus Adolphus College (Minnesota)

Lacrosse

Division I 

AIAW championship 1981–82.  Administered 1978–80 by the United States Women's Lacrosse Association (USWLA).
1978 Penn State def. Maryland 9-3
1979 Penn State def. Massachusetts 8-5
1980 Penn State def. Maryland 3-1
1981 Maryland def. Ursinus 5-4
1982 Temple (Pennsylvania) def. Maryland 3-2

Division II 

1981 Delaware
1982 Delaware

Division III 

1981 Trenton State (New Jersey)
1982 Millersville State (Pennsylvania)

Rowing 

Only AIAW championship was in 1982. The National Women's Rowing Association (NWRA) sponsored an annual open eights national championship from 1971 to 1979, among college and non-college teams.  (There were no eights prior to 1971.)  During this period, only in 1973 and 1975 did a college team win the national eights championship outright.  According to USRowing, contemporary news reports in 1976 and 1977 do not mention a national collegiate title.  Beginning in 1980, the NWRA sponsored the Women's Collegiate National Championship in varsity eights.

NWRA Open Eights top college finishers, 1971–1979 (champion in parentheses):

1971 Washington (first place: Vesper Boat Club)
1972 Washington (first place: College Boat Club)
1973 Radcliffe (NWRA open champion)
1974 Radcliffe (first place: Vesper Boat Club)
1975 Wisconsin (NWRA open champion)
1976 Wisconsin (first place: College Boat Club)
1977 Wisconsin (first place: Vesper Boat Club)
1978 Wisconsin (first place: Burnaby Boat Club)
1979 Yale (first place: Burnaby BC)

National Collegiate Varsity Eight Champions, 1980–1982:

1980 California
1981 Washington
1982 Washington (AIAW Champion)

Additional notes:
 A medalist in the 1975 NWRA regatta stated that the 1975 regatta was the 10th annual national women's rowing championship, as emblazoned on T-shirts from the event.
 One citation from 1996 states, "(The Cal Women's Crew) in 1979 finished second in the U.S. National Collegiate Championships. ... The 1980 Cal Women's Crew dominated the National Championships, ... They won the varsity eight, Cal's first ever varsity national championship in any women's sport."
 One citation from 1999 states, "1980. First Women’s Collegiate Rowing Championship held in Oak Ridge, TN."
 One citation from 2001 states, " Just seven years after its first race, the (Yale) women's team claimed its first national championship in 1979."
 After the last AIAW competition, the National Collegiate Rowing Championship was held from 1983 through 1996.  Washington won the varsity eight in 1983, 1984, 1985, 1987, and 1988.  Wisconsin won in 1986.  Cornell won in 1989.   Princeton won in 1990, 1993, 1994 and 1995.  Boston University won in 1991 and 1992.  Brown won in 1996.
 From 1997 through the present the NCAA has sponsored the women's collegiate rowing championship.

Skiing 

1977 Dartmouth (New Hampshire)
1978 Utah
1979 Middlebury (Vermont)
1980 Middlebury
1981 Vermont
1982 Colorado

From 1983 through the present the NCAA has sponsored a combined men's and women's team championship.

Soccer 

1980  Cortland State (New York) def. UCLA 5-1
1981 North Carolina def. Central Florida 1-0

The 1980 tournament was not officially sanctioned by the AIAW.  North Carolina, Harvard, Texas A&M, UCLA, Cortland State, Northern Colorado and Colorado State participated.  One reason for the tournament was to earn an official sanction for the sport, by complying with and fulfilling guidelines set forth by the AIAW.

From Fall 1982 through the present the NCAA has sponsored a women's championship.

Fastpitch softball

Division I (no division 1969–1979)

Women's College World Series

From 1969 to 1982, the women's collegiate softball championship was also known as the Women's College World Series and was promoted as such.  The Women's College World Series was played in Omaha, Nebraska, through 1979 and in Norman, Oklahoma, during 1980–1982.

AIAW championship 1973–82. Previously administered by the Amateur Softball Association and sanctioned by DGWS from 1969 to 1972.  Co-sponsored by the AIAW and ASA through 1979.

1969 John F. Kennedy College (Nebraska) (DGWS)
1970 John F. Kennedy College (DGWS)
1971 John F. Kennedy College (DGWS)
1972 Arizona State (DGWS)
1973 Arizona State
1974 Southwest Missouri State
1975 Omaha
1976 Michigan State
1977 Northern Iowa
1978 UCLA
1979 Texas Woman's
1980 Utah State
1981 Utah State
1982 Texas A&M

Division II 

1980 Emporia State (Kansas)
1981 Sacramento State
1982 Northern Iowa

Division III 

1980 Cal State Chico
1981 Eastern Connecticut State
1982 Bloomsburg State (Pennsylvania)

Junior/Community College 
1975 Golden West (California) def. Northeastern Colorado 22-0 (5 inn, mercy), perfect game
1976 Golden West
1977 Golden West

Slowpitch Softball 

1981 Florida State
1982 Florida State

After the last AIAW competition, collegiate national championships in slow-pitch softball were conducted in 1983 and 1984 by the Amateur Softball Association. The University of South Florida won both.  It appears that most of the college women's slow-pitch teams at that time were from Florida and North Carolina.

Swimming and diving

Division I (no division 1968–1976, Large College 1977–1979) 

1968 Arizona State (DGWS)
1969 Arizona State (DGWS)
1970 Arizona State (DGWS)
1971 Arizona State (DGWS)
1972 West Chester State (Pennsylvania) (DGWS)
1973 Arizona State
1974 Arizona State
1975 Miami
1976 Miami
1977 Arizona State
1978 Arizona State
1979 Florida
1980 Stanford
1981 Texas
1982 Texas

Division II (Small College 1977–1979) 

1977 Clarion State (Pennsylvania)
1978 Clarion State
1979 Nevada-Reno
1980 Clarion State
1981 Clarion State
1982 Clarion State

Division III 

1980 Hamline (Minnesota)
1981 Hamline
1982 Hamline

Synchronized swimming 

1977 Ohio State
1978 Ohio State
1979 Ohio State
1980 Ohio State, Arizona (tie)
1981 Arizona
1982 Ohio State

United States Synchronized Swimming has continued to sponsor national collegiate championships from 1983 through the present. From 1983 through 2004, Ohio State won 19 of the 22 titles. Arizona won in 1984. Stanford won in 1998, 1999, 2005 through 2008, 2013 and 2016. Ohio State won in 2009 through 2012, and 2015. Lindenwood won in 2014.

Tennis

Division I (no division 1968–1976, Large College 1977–1979)

AIAW championship 1977–82. Team championships were also bestowed from 1967 to 1979 by the United States Lawn Tennis Association (USLTA).  From 1958 to 1979, the USLTA also crowned individual collegiate national champions in singles and doubles. (The 1979 USLTA team award appears to have been based on the AIAW results.)

1967 Odessa College (Texas), Stanford (tie)
1968 Trinity (San Antonio)
1969 Trinity (San Antonio)
1970 Odessa College 
1971 Arizona State
1972 Arizona State
1973 Trinity (San Antonio)
1974 Arizona State
1975 Trinity (San Antonio)
1976 Trinity (San Antonio)
1977 USC ‡
1978 Stanford ‡
1979 USC
1980 USC
1981 UCLA
1982 Indiana

 ‡ 1977, 1978 USLTA champion: USC

Division II (Small College 1977–1979) 

1977 Tennessee-Chattanooga
1978 Tennessee-Chattanooga
1979 Tennessee-Chattanooga
1980 Cal Poly-Pomona
1981 Cal Poly-Pomona
1982 Richmond

Division III 

1980 UC Davis
1981 UC Davis
1982 Mary Washington (Virginia)

Junior/Community College 

1977 Indian River Community College

Indoor Track and Field 

1980 Texas-El Paso
1981 Virginia
1982 Nebraska

From 1983 through the present the NCAA has sponsored a women's team championship.

Outdoor Track and Field

Division I (no division 1969–1980)

AIAW championship 1972–82. The first National Intercollegiate Track and Field Championship was sponsored by DGWS in the spring of 1969.

1969 Texas Woman's (DGWS)
1970 Illinois (DGWS)
1971 Texas Woman's (DGWS)
1972 Cal State-Hayward
1973 Texas Woman's
1974 Prairie View A & M (Texas)
1975 UCLA
1976 Prairie View A & M
1977 UCLA
1978 Cal State Northridge
1979 Cal State Northridge
1980 Cal State Northridge
1981 Tennessee
1982 Texas

Division II 

1981 Cal Poly San Luis Obispo
1982 South Carolina State

Division III 

1981 Cal State-Hayward
1982 Wisconsin–La Crosse

Volleyball

Division I (no division 1969–1974, Large College 1975–1978) 

AIAW championship 1973–82. Previously administered by the Division of Girls' and Women's Sports (DGWS).

1969–70 Sul Ross State (Texas) def. UCLA (DGWS)
1970–71 Sul Ross State (Texas) def. Long Beach State (DGWS)
1971–72 UCLA def. Long Beach State (DGWS)
1972–73 Long Beach State def. Brigham Young
1973 Long Beach State def. Texas Woman's
1974 UCLA def. Hawaii
1975 UCLA def. Hawaii
1976 USC def. UCLA
1977 USC def. Hawaii
1978 Utah State def. UCLA
1979 Hawaii def. Utah State
1980 USC def. Pacific
1981 Texas def. Portland State

Division II (Small College 1975–1978) 

1975 Texas Lutheran
1976 Texas Lutheran
1977 UC Riverside
1978 Florida Technological University
1979 Hawaii-Hilo
1980 Cal State Northridge
1981 Hawaii-Hilo

Division III 

1979 Azusa Pacific (California)
1980 Sacramento State
1981 La Verne (California)

Junior/Community College 

1974 Eastern Arizona College
1975 Ricks College (Idaho)
1976 Mesa Community College (Arizona)
1977 Santa Ana College (California)

Bowling

The USBC (formerly ABC/Women’s International Bowling Congress) has conducted a women's intercollegiate bowling championship annually since 1975, although it was not an AIAW sport.

Notes

Sources 

 Archives of the Association for Intercollegiate Athletics for Women (AIAW), Special Collections, University of Maryland Libraries
 Virginia Hunt, "Governance of Women's Intercollegiate Athletics: an Historical Perspective," (Doctoral Dissertation, University of North Carolina - Greensboro, 1976), Ann Arbor, Michigan: University Microfilms (1977), 1-319
 Suzanne Willey, "The Governance of Women's Intercollegiate Athletics: Association for Intercollegiate Athletics for Women (AIAW), 1976–1982," (Thesis (P.E.D.), Indiana University, 1996), Eugene, Oregon: Microform Publications (1997), 1-351
 USA Field Hockey
 Women's Basketball Timeline 1890s-Present (pdf)
 Women's College Basketball Championship History Page ( 2009-10-24)
 USBC, Intercollegiate Team Championships
 NIFWA Team Champions
 Intercollegiate Tennis Association - The Milestones in Women's Collegiate Tennis
 The History of UCLA Women's Volleyball
 UW Women's Sports History, 1974–2004 (pdf-large)
 Trinity University Campus Spotlight, "Former Sports Standouts to be Inducted Into Trinity’s Athletic Hall of Fame"
 Long Beach Press-Telegram,"It All Started in Long Beach," 12/15/2004
 Bio: Marilyn Nolen: Women's Volleyball
 Cougar Volleyball 99 (pdf-large)
 McPherson College Hall of Fame 2004, Kathy Rogers Yoder
 BRO Forums, "UCLA: 97 NCAA titles and counting...." (Caution: before referencing, confirm a second source)
 TWU Athletics Hall Of Fame Committee Seeks Nominations For 2006 Induction
 Texas Woman's University Athletics Hall of Fame Class of 2002
 "The Institutionalization of a Gender Biased Sport Value System," Everhart & Pemberton, Winter, 2001
 Northern Illinois University Athletics Hall of Fame
 History of Synchronized Swimming in the U.S.
 Buckeye Champions
 SMS softball recognizes 1974 national championship team 30th anniversary
 2005 Sacramento State Hornets Softball Media Guide (pdf-large)
 “10 Most Memorable Moments in UNO Sports History”
 USTA supporting women’s collegiate tennis for nearly half a century
 Alabama Women's Golf 2003-04, page 7 (pdf-large)
 "Nearly 150 years old, Yale crew embodies spirit of Eli sports," May 17, 2001
 California Golden Bears Women's Crew
 “A rowing legend moves on,” April 15, 1998
 "Proposal To Add Women’s Rowing As A Varsity Sport, University Of Colorado, Boulder"
 UCLA Bruins Traditions
 Rowing (From Alexander Leitch, A Princeton Companion, copyright Princeton University Press (1978))
 Men's & Women's Skiing Past Individual Champions
 Men's & Women's Fencing Past Champions
 "Stanford’s Inferno Too Hot for Bucks"
 Women's Bowling Past Champions
 Women's Soccer Past Champions
 Men's & Women's Track & Field Indoor Champions
 Seminole Softball 2004 Media Guide, p 66 (pdf-large)
 National Fastpitch Coaches Association
 Wisconsin Women's Rowing 2005–2006 Media Guide - History and Results (pdf)
 Princeton Women's Rowing Record Book (pdf)
 The History of ASU Badminton (pdf)
 Sun Devil Swimming & Diving Program History
 Cornell Big Red - On Campus in the Nineties
 Colorado College Women's Soccer History
 History of Penn State Women's Lacrosse (pdf)
 2007 Maryland Women's Lacrosse Media Guide (pdf)
 Wisconsin Badgers Athletics: A pretty good decade so far, BadgerBeat.com

College sports championships in the United States
Recurring sporting events established in 1971